George Goudey Sanderson (March 5, 1840 – May 27, 1919) was an insurance broker, prominent shipowner and political figure in Nova Scotia, Canada. He represented Yarmouth County in the Nova Scotia House of Assembly from 1904 to 1906 as a Liberal member. He died on May 27, 1919 from exhaustion following rheumatoid arthritis.

References
 A Directory of the Members of the Legislative Assembly of Nova Scotia, 1758-1958, Public Archives of Nova Scotia (1958)

1840 births
1919 deaths
Nova Scotia Liberal Party MLAs
People from Yarmouth, Nova Scotia